Kozakov or Kozákov, or Kozakova may refer to

Mikhail Kozakov (1934–2011), Soviet-Israeli film and theatre director and actor
Olga Kozakova (born 1951), Soviet volleyball player
Ještěd-Kozákov Ridge in the Czech Republic

See also
Kazakov, a surname
Kozak (disambiguation)
Kozak (surname)
Kazak (disambiguation)